Rawa Aopa Watumohai National Park is a national park on the Indonesian island of Sulawesi, in the province of South East Sulawesi. It was declared in 1989, and has an area of 1,050 km². The park ranges from sea level to the altitude of 981 m. It contains the Aopa peat swamp, the largest in Sulawesi, and is recognised as a wetland of international importance.

Flora and fauna
The park has varied vegetation: sub-montane rain forests, mangrove forests, coastal forests, savanna and freshwater swamp forests. In the park there have been recorded 323 species of plant, including Borassus flabellifer, Bruguiera gymnorhiza, Callicarpa celebica, Cratoxylum formosum and Metrosideros petiolata.

It is home to Babirusa, both species of endangered Anoa – miniature water buffaloes – and 155 bird species, of which  37 are endemic to Sulawesi. Birds in the park include the maleo, lesser adjutant, woolly-necked stork, collared kingfisher, Yellow-crested cockatoo, vinous-breasted sparrowhawk, Sulawesi black pigeon and Nicobar pigeon. The park also provides habitat to a population of 170 endangered milky storks. Primates in the park include the spectral tarsier and the vulnerable booted macaque.

The park also protects 11 reptile and 20 fish species, and is an important nursery area for crabs, fish and prawns.

Human habitation
The area of the park has been traditionally inhabited by the Moronene people. During the Dutch colonial era there were 7 villages within the area of the current national park. In the 1950s many Moronene villagers moved to other parts of the island, but since the 1970s there was a back-migration. However, local authorities doubted that those returning were of Moronene ancestry and would have rights to the land. Consequently, after the national park has been declared, there have been several attempts by local authorities to evict people living in the park. In 1997 security forces burned down 175 houses, and the following year another 88 houses. In a third intervention in 2001, another 100 houses were destroyed.

Conservation and threats
The national park has been declared in 1989, and in 2011 it has been designated as a Ramsar wetland of international importance.

Threats to the park include illegal logging, poaching and collection of eggs.

See also 

 List of national parks of Indonesia
 Geography of Indonesia

References

External links
 Rawa Aopa Watumohai National Park home page
 List of notable species recorded in the park

National parks of Indonesia
Sulawesi
Protected areas established in 1989
Ramsar sites in Indonesia
Geography of Southeast Sulawesi
Tourist attractions in Southeast Sulawesi